
Gmina Bartoszyce is a rural gmina (administrative district) in Bartoszyce County, Warmian-Masurian Voivodeship, in northern Poland, on the border with Russia. Its seat is the town of Bartoszyce, although the town is not part of the territory of the gmina.

Villages
Gmina Bartoszyce contains the villages and settlements of:

  Ardapy
  Bajdyty
  Barciszewo
  Bąsze
  Bezledy
  Biała Podlaska
  Bieliny
  Borki
  Borki Sędrowskie
  Brzostkowo
  Bukowo
  Burkarty
  Ceglarki
  Ciemna Wola
  Czerwona Górka
  Dąbrowa
  Dębiany
  Drawa
  Falczewo
  Frączki
  Galinki
  Galiny
  Ganitajny
  Gile
  Glitajny
  Głomno
  Gromki
  Gruda
  Gruszynki
  Jarkowo
  Karolewka
  Karolewko
  Kicina
  Kiersity
  Kiertyny Małe
  Kiertyny Wielkie
  Kinkajmy
  Kisity
  Klekotki
  Kosy
  Krawczyki
  Króle
  Kromarki
  Łabędnik
  Łabędnik Mały
  Łapkiejmy
  Leginy
  Lejdy
  Lipina
  Lisówka
  Łojdy
  Łoskajmy
  Lusiny
  Markiny
  Maszewy
  Matyjaszki
  Merguny
  Minty
  Molwity
  Nalikajmy
  Nowe Witki
  Nuny
  Okopa
  Osieka
  Parkoszewo
  Pasarnia
  Perkujki
  Perkuliki
  Piergozy
  Piersele
  Pilwa
  Plęsy
  Połęcze
  Posłusze
  Rodnowo
  Sędławki
  Skitno
  Sokolica
  Solno
  Sortławki
  Sporwiny
  Spurgle
  Spytajny
  Styligi
  Szczeciny
  Szwarunki
  Szwaruny
  Szylina Mała
  Szylina Wielka
  Tapilkajmy
  Tolko
  Tromity
  Trutnowo
  Wajsnory
  Wardomy
  Wargielity
  Wawrzyny
  Węgoryty
  Wiatrak
  Wipławki
  Wirwilty
  Witki
  Wojciechy
  Wojtkowo
  Wola
  Wólka
  Wyręba
  Wysieka
  Żardyny
  Zawiersze 
  Żydowo

Neighbouring gminas
Gmina Bartoszyce is bordered by the town of Bartoszyce and by the gminas of Bisztynek, Górowo Iławeckie, Kiwity, Lidzbark Warmiński and Sępopol. It also borders Russia (Kaliningrad oblast).

References

Polish official population figures 2006

Bartoszyce
Bartoszyce County